The Fixer is the name of two characters appearing in American comic books published by Marvel Comics: Roscoe Sweeney and Paul Norbert Ebersol.

Roscoe Sweeney was portrayed by Kevin Nagle in the Marvel Cinematic Universe series Daredevil while Paul Norbert Ebersol has appeared in animated media.

Publication history
The first Marvel Comics character known as the Fixer was Roscoe Sweeney. He first appeared in Daredevil #1 (Apr. 1964), and was created by Stan Lee, Jack Kirby, and Bill Everett.

The second iteration of Fixer was long-time supervillain Paul Norbert Ebersol, first appearing in Strange Tales #141 (February 1966) and was created by Stan Lee and Jack Kirby. Much later, he appeared as a regular character in Thunderbolts, until he was forced to leave the team.

Fictional character biography

Roscoe Sweeney
         
Roscoe Sweeney was a gangster and crooked fight promoter who was involved in extortion and illegal gambling who operated as the "Fixer". He paid boxer "Battling Jack" Murdock to take a fall and lose a fight. Murdock accepted the money, however, the boxer became determined to continue the fight and eventually won by a knockout. The Fixer's right-hand man Slade killed Jack after the fight in retaliation. Learning of his father's murder and vowing to bring men like the Fixer to justice, Matt Murdock became a lawyer as well as the superhero Daredevil to do so. Fixer and Slade went to Fogwell's Gym where they encountered the Daredevil. When Fixer and Slade ran for it upon their being disarmed, the Daredevil pursued them into the subway station. After the Man Without Fear tripped Slade, the Fixer had a fatal heart attack when confronted by the Daredevil and died. As Fixer's body fell onto the subway tracks, the Man Without Fear stopped a subway from running over Fixer's body. Slade was arrested and sentenced to death by the electric chair.

Paul Norbert Ebersol
         
Paul Norbert Ebersol was born in Dayton, Ohio. He was a scientist who held a number of odd jobs, including auto mechanic, television repairman, and electronics laboratory assistant. He then became the second and more prominent "Fixer", a supervillain and genius-level criminal inventor who has often worked for criminal cartels like HYDRA.

In his first appearance, he escaped from prison, teamed with his partner Mentallo in an attempted takeover of the New York S.H.I.E.L.D. headquarters, and even captured Nick Fury. Fixer and Mentallo were defeated by Tony Stark and S.H.I.E.L.D. troops. His connection with THEM was revealed; and THEM was later revealed as part of HYDRA. Behind the scenes, he was even revealed as the chief of the HYDRA Science Division.

With Mentallo, the Fixer later escaped prison again. They invaded the New York S.H.I.E.L.D. headquarters and captured the Thing. They then invaded the Baxter Building, battled the Thing and Nick Fury, and used Doctor Doom's time machine to bring Deathlok from his alternate future. Mentallo then mind-controlled Deathlok in an attempted assassination of the U.S. president, but Fixer and Mentallo were defeated by the Fantastic Four and taken into custody by S.H.I.E.L.D. The pair was freed from prison by a HYDRA force controlled by Baron Karza. Fixer created the living machine-intelligence Computrex, which was destroyed by the Micronauts who then defeated Fixer and Mentallo.

Fixer and Mentallo then aided Professor Power in his attempt to add Professor X's powers to Mentallo's, but they were defeated by Spider-Man. Fixer attempted to loot Northwind Observatory of Bruce Banner's inventions, but was captured by Captain America. Fixer then invaded the West Coast Avengers Compound in an attempt to steal Iron Man's armor, but was defeated by Iron Man and Ka-Zar.

When Baron Helmut Zemo formed the fourth incarnation of the Masters of Evil, Fixer served as his right-hand man. When the Masters of Evil invaded Avengers Mansion, Fixer created a device enabling Baron Zemo to control Blackout. Fixer helped engineer the capture of Captain America, Black Knight, and Edwin Jarvis. Fixer was apprehended by Ant-Man. Behind the scenes, Fixer was overpowered by the Super-Adaptoid which changed places with him. The Super-Adaptoid disguised as the Fixer later escaped prison. The real Fixer was discovered by the Avengers in the android's former confinement tube at Avengers Island. Fixer later escaped prison with Yellowjacket who then spurned his romantic advances. The Fixer followed Yellowjacket and battled Yellowjacket and the Black Knight before escaping.

In Zemo's second incarnation of the Masters of Evil, the team changed their identity to the Thunderbolts, while Fixer adopted the alias of Techno. He was then apparently killed when his neck was broken by Iron, one of the Elements of Doom, and he transferred his mind into a robotic body, and this Techno sided, alone among the Thunderbolts, with Zemo when he went ahead with his scheme to conquer the planet.

Zemo and Techno decamped to one of Zemo's bases, where Techno began to experiment with cloning, offering to clone Zemo an unscarred body, and even cloning Kevin Costner for fun at one point. After the two fell out, Techno infiltrated the Thunderbolts by replacing Ogre, while continuing his experiments behind-the-scenes, including recovering Jolt's body when she was killed and placing it in a healing tube.

Techno's impersonation of Ogre ended when Scourge of the Underworld stowed away inside him, shrunken, and destroyed his body from the inside, while he refused to kill Jolt again to allow him to construct a new body. However, his backup plan worked, and his consciousness was returned to his original human body—mostly healed, although the nerve damage in his neck meant he required his tech-pac to bypass the damage—and the human Ebersol, initially amnesiac of the robot's exploits, returned to calling himself the Fixer.

Fixer then became one of the Redeemers, a government-backed team whereby criminals could use it to accelerate their sentences and clear their record until most of that team was slaughtered by Graviton. He joined with the reunited Thunderbolts to stop Graviton, and he was one of the team members exiled to Counter-Earth. By a complicated series of events, at the end of the trip to Counter-Earth, Zemo's consciousness ended up in Fixer's tech-pac. By threatening to disable it and leave him quadriplegic, Zemo managed to force Fixer to transfer the Baron's consciousness to his Counter-Earth counterpart's body.

The team remained on Counter-Earth for some time, until, in sealing a rift, they returned home, leaving Jolt (whom Fixer saved from burning out in helping to seal the rift) behind. Finally, after Moonstone went insane, Fixer furnished a device that could give the combined Avengers and Thunderbolts a couple of seconds to make their move; he then left.

Later, Deadpool visited Fixer at his holiday home to enlist his help in saving Cable. After a brief fight, Fixer accepted the challenge (and Deadpool's monetary inducement), and successfully bonded new, benign, techno-organic mesh to Cable. Sometime after this, Fixer suddenly reappeared to save his former teammate MACH-IV from a fall. Fixer recruited MACH-IV to join a secretive group headed by Zemo to combat and destroy Genis-Vell, a member of the Thunderbolts whom Zemo had brought back to life. The process was flawed, however, and Genis' existence now threatened the universe.

After Genis was destroyed, Fixer remained with the Thunderbolts, who were now helmed by Zemo. He helped the team recruit supervillains to the pro-registration cause during the Civil War. He also helped Zemo save the Wellspring of Power from the Grandmaster. After Zemo was betrayed and the Thunderbolts were placed under S.H.I.E.L.D. control, Fixer and MACH-IV were offered jobs with the Commission on Superhuman Activities.

Ebersol has been identified as one of the 142 registered superheroes who appear on the cover of the comic book.

During the Heroic Age storyline, Fixer works as the Raft's supervisor in its section for male supervillains when Captain Steve Rogers and Luke Cage arrive to recruit Ghost.

As well as working with the Thunderbolts, Fixer has also been seen working with Baron Zemo.

During the Fear Itself storyline, Fixer was seen working on a forcefield to secure the rounded up prisoners that escaped from the Raft after Juggernaut, in the form of Kuurth: Breaker of Stone, leveled it.

After escaping the Raft by time-traveling, the Thunderbolts wound up meeting their counterparts - the first Thunderbolts team. Being as arrogant as they are, present-Fixer and past-Fixer got into an argument in which Fixer impulsively killed his past self. To preserve the timeline, Fixer surgically changed himself to restore his younger appearance and preserved his age by a blood-transfusion from Centurius. Fixer and the past Thunderbolts' memories were wiped, stranding Fixer in a stable time-loop and preserving the timeline after his mistake.

During the Avengers: Standoff! storyline, Fixer resurfaces where is shown to be a prisoner of the S.H.I.E.L.D.-established gated community Pleasant Hill where Kobik, fragments of a Cosmic Cube transformed into a nigh-omnipotent child, turned him into a mild-mannered mechanic named Phil. Phil was able to see through this and arranged a meet-up with a man named Jim. Upon showing the training video he stole that featured the details about Pleasant Hill by Mayor Maria Hill to the S.H.I.E.L.D. Cadets, Phil used the machine he invented to turn himself back into Fixer and Jim back into Baron Helmut Zemo. Both of them vowed to use the device on the other brainwashed supervillains and reduce Pleasant Hill to dust. Fixer and Baron Zemo began to restore the memories of the other inmates one by one. Fixer later invented a device that would help Baron Zemo and his fellow villains find Kobik.

Following the Pleasant Hill incident, Fixer joined up with Winter Soldier's incarnation of the Thunderbolts with the goal to keep S.H.I.E.L.D. from continuing the Kobik Project.

At the time when Baron Zemo formed the third incarnation of the Masters of Evil, Fixer joined the Thunderbolts into fighting them which ends with the Thunderbolts being defeated.

During the "Opening Salvo" part of the Secret Empire storyline, Fixer defected to the Masters of Evil after Winter Soldier was sent back in time to World War II and Kobik had shattered. While Atlas and Moonstone worked to gather Kobik's pieces, Fixer maintained the inventory of the pieces he has with Erik Selvig. Fixer was later present when Baron Helmut Zemo is advised by the Kobik-reprogrammed Captain America into having the Masters of Evil be part of the Army of Evil.

Powers and abilities
The second version of Fixer is an intuitive genius at the invention of weapons and other electrical and mechanical devices. He has designed numerous devices and paraphernalia for himself, including his body armor. As for weaponry, he has used various devices including bombs, electronic jamming devices, guided missiles, sonic amplifiers, brain-wave scanners, and mind-control pods. He has also built anti-gravity discs which are affixed to his feet and allow flight at the speed of sound, as well as a special mask that contains a three-hour air supply and acts as an air pressure reduction valve, together with enabling flight at high velocity and high altitude. Fixer's Techno body can mentally control his robotic body which is capable of assuming virtually any form from blast cannons to pile-drivers to even the form of a space station. To take on larger shapes, Techno physically absorbed the mass of other mechanical materials nearby into himself. Techno's body also could morph into forms that appeared completely organic, as with his assumed guise of Thunderbolt machine-smith Ogre.

In other media

Television
 The Paul Norbert Ebersol incarnation of Fixer, called Mr. Fix, appears in Iron Man: Armored Adventures, voiced by Donny Lucas. This version is a genius inventor and high-tech arms dealer with ties to the Maggia. For protection, he employs highly sophisticated communications and surveillance equipment, teams of soldiers, and individuals equipped with high-tech weapons, such as Whiplash. In season two, Justin Hammer injects Fix with a nano-virus to force him to make weapons for the former, primarily the Titanium Man armor. Following a disastrous first outing in it however, Hammer activates the nano-virus, killing Fix's physical body and allowing Hammer to turn his consciousness into an artificial intelligence. Calling him "Mr. Fix 2.0", Hammer forces him to keep working on the former's projects to the exclusion of all else. Unbeknownst to Hammer, Fix secretly begins plotting revenge against him for this. Over time, he blackmails Hammer before eventually exposing his criminal activities and creating "zombification gas" to turn Hammer into a zombie, though Iron Man destroys Fix 2.0's console.
 The Paul Norbert Ebersol incarnation of Fixer appears in Marvel Disk Wars: The Avengers.
 Roscoe Sweeney appears in Daredevil (2015), portrayed by Kevin Nagle. As in the comics, he has Jack Murdock killed when the boxer refused to take a dive in one of his matches. Following Jack's death, Sweeney hid out in another country under the alias "Al Marino". In the episode "Kinbaku", Sweeney is subdued by Elektra so Jack's son Matt Murdock can exact revenge. Matt severely beats Roscoe, but turns him over to the police instead, much to Elektra's disappointment.
 Paul Norbert Ebersol appears in Avengers Assemble, voiced by Rick D. Wasserman. This version previously worked for Stark Industries until he was fired for giving away company secrets. He first appears as Masters of Evil member Fixer in the episode "Under Siege" due to his hatred for Iron Man before later appearing as Thunderbolts member Techno in the group's self-titled episode and "Thunderbolts Revealed".

Film
The Roscoe Sweeney incarnation of Fixer, renamed Edward "Eddie" Fallon, appears in Daredevil (2003), portrayed by Mark Margolis. This version previously employed a young Wilson Fisk as an enforcer.

Video games
 The Paul Norbert Ebersol incarnation of Fixer appears as a boss, later playable character, in Marvel: Avengers Alliance.
 Paul Norbert Ebersol / Techno appears in Lego Marvel's Avengers via the "Thunderbolts" DLC.
 The Paul Norbert Ebersol incarnation of Fixer appears in Marvel: Avengers Alliance 2.

Music
The industrial band Mentallo and the Fixer derive their name from the Paul Norbert Ebersol incarnation of Fixer and his former partner Mentallo.

References

External links
 Fixer I at Marvel.com
 Fixer II at Marvel.com
 Fixer I at Marvel Wikia
 Fixer II at Marvel Wikia
 Fixer I at Marvel Appendix

Characters created by Jack Kirby
Characters created by Stan Lee
Comics characters introduced in 1966
Fictional characters from Ohio
Fictional gangsters
Fictional inventors
Hydra (comics) agents
Marvel Comics characters who are shapeshifters
Marvel Comics cyborgs
Marvel Comics robots
Marvel Comics scientists
Marvel Comics superheroes
Marvel Comics supervillains